Maritalea  is a genus of Gram-negative, strictly aerobic, oxidase- and catalase-positive, rod-shaped, motile bacteria with peritrichous flagella from the family of Hyphomicrobiaceae.

References

Hyphomicrobiales
Bacteria genera